The 2022–23 season is the 54th season in the existence of Accrington Stanley Football Club and the club's fifth consecutive season in League One. In addition to the league, they will also compete in the 2022–23 FA Cup, the 2022–23 EFL Cup and the 2022–23 EFL Trophy.

Transfers

In

Out

Loans in

Loans out

Pre-season and friendlies
Stanley announced their first pre-season friendly on 17 May, with Blackburn Rovers visiting on 9 July. A further match with Stoke City was confirmed on 18 May. On 30 May, a third friendly, a home fixture against Preston North End was added. Sunderland was also confirmed as visitors to the Wham Stadium. A fifth home pre-season friendly was confirmed, against Wigan Athletic. A behind-closed-doors meeting against Crystal Palace was also added.

Competitions

Overall record

League One

League table

Results summary

Results by round

Matches

On 23 June, the league fixtures were announced.

FA Cup

Accrington were drawn away to Crawley Town in the first round, at home to Barnet in the second round and away to Boreham Wood in the third round.

EFL Cup

Stanley were drawn at home to Tranmere Rovers in the first round.

EFL Trophy

On 20 June, the initial Group stage draw was made, grouping Accrington with Rochdale and Salford City. Three days later, Liverpool U21s joined Northern Group D. Stanley were drawn away to Grimsby Town in the second round to Burton Albion in the third round and to Lincoln City in the quarter-final. In the semi-finals, Accrington Stanley were drawn at home to Bolton Wanderers.

References

Accrington Stanley
Accrington Stanley F.C. seasons
English football clubs 2022–23 season